The 1992 European Espoirs Wrestling Championships was the 11th edition of European Espoirs Wrestling Championships  was held from 22 April to 29 August 1992 in Szekesfehervar, Hungary.

Medal table

Medal summary

Men's freestyle

Men's Greco-Roman

References

External links 
 Database

Wrestling
European Espoirs Wrestling Championships
W
Euro